Heterogram (classical compound: "different" + "written") is a term used mostly in the study of ancient texts for a special kind of a logogram consisting of the embedded written representation of a word in a foreign language, which does not have a spoken counterpart in the main (matrix) language of the text. In most cases, the matrix and embedded languages share the same script. While from the perspective of the embedded language the word may be written either phonetically (representing the sounds of the embedded language) or logographically, it is never a phonetic spelling from the point of view of the matrix language of the text, since there is no relationship between the symbols used and the underlying pronunciation of the word in the matrix language.

In English, the written abbreviations e.g., i.e., and viz. are sometimes read respectively as "for example", "that is", and "namely".  When read this way, the abbreviations for the Latin phrases exempli gratia, id est, and videlicet are being used logographically to indicate English phrases which are rough translations.  Similarly, the ampersand ⟨&⟩, originally a ligature for the Latin word et, in many European languages stands logographically for the local word for "and" regardless of pronunciation.  This can be contrasted with the older way of abbreviating et cetera—&c.—where ⟨&⟩ is used to represent et as a full loanword, not a heterogram.

Heterograms are frequent in cuneiform scripts, such as the Akkadian cuneiform, which uses Sumerian heterograms, or the Anatolian cuneiform, which uses both Sumerian and Akkadian heterograms. In Middle Iranian scripts derived from the Aramaic scripts (such as the Pahlavi scripts), all logograms are heterograms coming from Aramaic. Sometimes such heterograms are referred to by terms identifying the source language such as "Sumerograms" or "Aramaeograms". 
Another example is kanji in Japanese, literally "Sinograms" or "Han characters".

See also
Heterography and homography
Ideogram
Logogram

References 

 Encyclopedia Iranica, Ideographic Writing

Communication design
Graphic design
Pictograms
Writing systems
Multilingualism